The Czechoslovak Athletics Championships was an annual outdoor track and field competition organised by the Czechoslovakia Athletics Association, which served as the national championship for the sport in Czechoslovakia from 1919 to 1992. After the dissolution of Czechoslovakia in 1993, the competition was replaced by independent Slovakian and Czech championships.

Men

100 metres

200 metres

400 metres

800 metres

1500 metres

5000 metres

10,000 metres

25K run
1960: Miroslav Ciboch
1961: Pavel Kantorek
1990: Lubomír Tesáček

Marathon
The 1984 Czechoslovak Marathon Championships was held on a short course, but the winner remained valid.

3000 metres steeplechase

110 metres hurdles

200 metres hurdles

400 metres hurdles

High jump

Pole vault

Long jump

Triple jump

Shot put

Discus throw

Hammer throw

Javelin throw

Decathlon

20 kilometres walk
The 1972 race was held as a 20,000 metres track walk. The 1991 race was held on a short course, but the winner remained valid.

50 kilometres walk

Women

100 metres

200 metres

400 metres

800 metres

1500 metres

3000 metres

10,000 metres

Marathon
The 1984 Czechoslovak Marathon Championships was held on a short course, but the winner remained valid.

80 metres hurdles

100 metres hurdles

200 metres hurdles
1970: Vera Slavicová
1971: Vlasta Přikrylová
1972: Zdenka Cerná

400 metres hurdles

High jump

Long jump

Triple jump
1990: Dagmar Urbánková
1991: Šárka Kadlubcová
1992: Šárka Kadlubcová

Shot put

Discus throw

Javelin throw

Pentathlon

Heptathlon

10 kilometres walk
The 1991 women's Czechoslovak Championships race in the 10 km walk was held over a short course, but the winner remained valid.

References

Champions 1960–1992
Czechoslovakian Championships. GBR Athletics. Retrieved 2021-01-12.

Winners
 List
Czechoslovak Championships
Athletics